Tedj Bensaoula (born 1 December 1954 in Tessala, Sidi Bel Abbès Province) is an Algerian football manager and former player. He currently manages CR Témouchent in the Algerian Ligue Professionnelle 2.

Biography

Early years
Tedj Bensaoula was born in the farm of his grandparents, on the heights of the massif of Tessala. In 1958 his family was driven out of this area prohibited during the Liberation War, the family moved to Hammam Bou Hadjar, Tedj was four years old.

Club career
Bensaoula played with MC Oran in Algeria and with Le Havre AC and USL Dunkerque in France.

International career
Bensaoula participated with the Algeria national football team at two editions of the FIFA World Cup, in 1982 (one goal scored) and 1986. He also participated in the 1980 Summer Olympics.

Gallery

Career statistics

International statistics

International goals
Scores and results list Algeria's goal tally first. "Score" column indicates the score after the player's goal.

International goals (vs clubs)

Honours

Clubs
MC Oran
Algerian Championship: Third place 1979

Le Havre
French Ligue 2: 1985

International
 Mediterranean Games: Bronze medal 1979
 Africa Cup of Nations: Runner-up 1980; Third place 1984
 Summer Olympics: Quarterfinal 1980
 FIFA World Cup: First round 1982, 1986

References

1954 births
Living people
People from Sidi Bel Abbès Province
Algerian footballers
Algerian expatriate footballers
Algeria international footballers
Olympic footballers of Algeria
Association football forwards
MC Oran players
Le Havre AC players
USL Dunkerque players
Ligue 1 players
Footballers at the 1980 Summer Olympics
1982 FIFA World Cup players
1986 FIFA World Cup players
1980 African Cup of Nations players
1984 African Cup of Nations players
1986 African Cup of Nations players
Mediterranean Games bronze medalists for Algeria
Competitors at the 1979 Mediterranean Games
Algeria national football team managers
MC Oran managers
Expatriate footballers in France
Algerian expatriate sportspeople in France
Algerian football managers
Mediterranean Games medalists in football
21st-century Algerian people